Lukáš Pokorný (born 5 July 1993) is a Czech former professional footballer who played as a defender.

Club career
Pokorný began his career at Slovan Liberec, making his senior league debut on 2 March 2014 in a Fortuna liga 3–2 win at Jihlava and playing 60 league matches, scoring two goals.

He signed for Ligue 1 side Montpellier HSC in January 2017 for a reported fee of €1.5 million.

In January 2018, Pokorný returned to his native country, signing with Slavia Prague. The transfer fee was estimated as €800,000.

In January 2019, he joined Bohemians 1905 on loan until the end of the season.

Pokorný retired in November 2021, aged 28, due to recurring injury problems.

International career
Pokorný made his senior international debut for Czech Republic on 31 October 2016 in a friendly match against Armenia.

Career statistics

Honours
Slovan Liberec
Czech Cup: 2014–15

References

External links
 
 
 Lukáš Pokorný official international statistics

1993 births
Living people
Association football defenders
Czech footballers
Czech expatriate footballers
FC Slovan Liberec players
Montpellier HSC players
SK Slavia Prague players
Bohemians 1905 players
Czech First League players
Ligue 1 players
Expatriate footballers in France
Czech Republic international footballers